Ottokar Chiari (1 February 1853 – 12 May 1918) was an Austrian laryngologist and professor at the University of Vienna who was a native of Prague.

At Vienna he was an assistant to Leopold von Schrötter (1837–1908), and later succeeded Karl Stoerk (1832–1899) as director of the laryngological clinic. He was the son of gynecologist Johann Baptist Chiari (1817–1854), and a younger brother to pathologist Hans Chiari (1851–1916).

Ottokar Chiari was a specialist in the field of rhinolaryngology, and is credited for advancing new surgical procedures at the laryngological clinic in Vienna. In 1912 he introduced the transethmoid trans-sphenoid operation.

In 1932, the Chiarigasse in Favoriten-Vienna was named in his honor.

Selected writings 
 Erfahrungen aus dem Gebiete der Hals- und Nasen-Krankheiten. (Experiences involving nose and throat Diseases, according to Results of Ambulatoriums). (1887).
 Krankheiten der oberen Luftwege. Vols. 1–3. Leipzig und Wien: Franz Deuticke, (1903).
 Die Wiener Klinik für Nasen- und Kehlkopfkrankheiten : erste Vorlesung in der neuen Klinik (1911)
 Chirurgie des Kehlkopfes und der Luftröhre (Surgery of the larynx and trachea) (1916).

References 
 This article incorporates text based on a translation of the equivalent article at the German Wikipedia.

External links 
 Utah.edu;  J Neurosurg 95:1083-1096, 2001 The history and evolution of transsphenoidal surgery.
 Medicus Books, Antiquariat for Medicine

1853 births
1918 deaths
19th-century Austrian physicians
Austrian otolaryngologists
Academic staff of the University of Vienna
Austrian nobility
Austro-Hungarian people
Physicians from Prague
20th-century Austrian physicians